Leo Fransisco (born 31 October 1994) is a Sri Lankan cricketer. He made his first-class debut for Sri Lanka Army Sports Club in the 2013–14 Premier Trophy on 31 January 2014.

References

External links
 

1994 births
Living people
Sri Lankan cricketers
Kurunegala Youth Cricket Club cricketers
Sri Lanka Army Sports Club cricketers
Sportspeople from Kurunegala